Mladen Dolar (born 29 January 1951) is a Slovene philosopher, psychoanalyst, cultural theorist and film critic.

Dolar was born in Maribor as the son of the literary critic Jaro Dolar. In 1978 he graduated in Philosophy and French language at the University of Ljubljana, under the supervision of the renowned philosopher Božidar Debenjak. He later studied at the University of Paris VII and the University of Westminster.

Dolar was the co-founder, together with Slavoj Žižek and Rastko Močnik, of the Society for Theoretical Psychoanalysis, whose main goal is to achieve a synthesis between Lacanian psychoanalysis and the philosophy of German idealism.

Dolar has taught at the University of Ljubljana since 1982. In 2010 Dolar began his tenure as an Advising Researcher in theory at the Jan Van Eyck Academie, Maastricht, The Netherlands. His main fields of expertise are the philosophy of G. W. F. Hegel (on which he has written several books, including a two-volume interpretation of Hegel's Phenomenology of Mind) and French structuralism. He is also  a music theoretician and film critic.

Dolar's A Voice and Nothing More, a study of the voice in its linguistic, metaphysical, physical, ethical, and political dimensions, has been translated into six languages.

Bibliography 
Mladen Dolar EGS Faculty Page (Biography & Works)

References

External links 
 Portrait on Dolar in the Neue Zürcher Zeitung (in german)
 Jan van Eyck Academie Profile

1951 births
Living people
University of Ljubljana alumni
University of Paris alumni
Academic staff of the University of Ljubljana
20th-century Slovenian philosophers
Slovenian psychoanalysts
Writers from Maribor
Yugoslav expatriates in France
21st-century Slovenian philosophers